Anime NebrasKon is an annual three-day anime convention held during October at the Mid-America Center in Council Bluffs, Iowa. It is organized by the Nebraska Japanese Animation Society.

Programming
The convention typically offers an artist's alley, anime idol, anime music video contest, cosplay contests, cosplay masquerade, dance/rave, dating auction, dealer's room, game room (video, tournaments, tabletop), formal ball, human chess, panels, and talent shows. The convention raised $2,600 for Big Brothers Big Sisters during the 2012 charity auction. Charity auctions prior to 2012 raised around $1,000 which was donated to Make-a-Wish and Open Door Mission. The convention's charity events in 2015 benefited the National Alliance on Mental Illness and raised around $7,500. Basset and Beagle Rescue of the Heartland was 2018's charity. The conventions charity events in 2022 benefited The Trevor Project.

History
Anime NebrasKon was founded by the members of University of Nebraska-Lincoln's anime club (Otaku Jinrui) in 2004 as an fund-raising project and had 300 attendees at the first convention.  Due to the conventions growth, in 2009 it moved to the Holiday Inn Omaha Convention Center in Omaha, Nebraska, and added 24-hour programming. Weddings have been held at the convention in both 2010 and 2011. The dealers room was expanded in 2012 because of renovations at the Ramada. An attendee on the way to the convention in 2012 was briefly detained by police after entering a bank wearing cosplay from the series Resident Evil. For 2016, the convention moved to La Vista in order to accommodate growth. Anime NebrasKon 2020 was cancelled due to the COVID-19 pandemic.

Event history

NebKon Abridged
Anime NebrasKon held a one-day event on July 9, 2022, at the DoubleTree by Hilton Hotel Omaha Downtown in Omaha, Nebraska named NebKon Abridged.

Mascot
Anime NebrasKon's mascot is the Husker Ninja.

References

External links
Anime NebrasKon Website

Anime conventions in the United States
Recurring events established in 2004
2004 establishments in Nebraska
Nebraska culture
University of Nebraska–Lincoln
Annual events in Iowa
Iowa culture
Festivals in Iowa
Tourist attractions in Council Bluffs, Iowa
Conventions in Iowa